USS Kiowa has been the name of more than one United States Navy ship, and may refer to:

, later USS SP-711, a patrol vessel in commission from 1917 to 1918
, a cargo ship in commission from 1918 to 1919
, later ATF-72, a tug commissioned in 1943 and transferred to the Dominican Republic in 1972

Kiowa